Marine Diesel Oil (MDO) is a type of fuel oil and is a blend of gasoil and heavy fuel oil, with more gasoil than intermediate fuel oil used in the maritime field. Marine Diesel Oil is also called "Distillate Marine Diesel". MDO is widely used by medium speed and medium/high speed marine diesel engines. It is also used in the larger low speed and medium speed propulsion engine which normally burn residual fuel. Those fuels result from a catalytic cracking and visbreaking refinery. Marine diesel oil has been condemned for its nimiety of sulfur, so many countries and organizations established regulations and laws on MDO use. Due to its lower price compared to more refined fuel, MDO is favored particularly by shipping industry.

Specification
ISO 8217 of the International Standards Organization (ISO) is the primary standard of MDO. 

Marine fuels range in viscosity from less than one centistoke (cSt) to about 700 cSt at 50°C (122°F). (1 cSt = 1 mm2/s.) And higher viscosity grades are preheated during use to bring their viscosity into the range suitable for fuel injection (8 to 27 cSt).  But MDO does not need to be preheated before using. According to Chevron, MDO has a sulfur limit varies from 1 to 4.5 percent by mass for different grades and Sulfur Emission Control Areas (SECAs).

Manufacturing procedure
MDO is made from a catalytic cracking and visbreaking refinery. The catalytic cracking operation breaks large molecules into small molecules. It happens in high temperature and with appropriate catalyst. 
Visbreaking is a process that turn the bottom product of the vacuum unit, which has extremely high viscosity, into lower viscosity, marketable product. In visbreaking, a relatively mild thermal cracking operation is performed. And the amount of cracking is limited by the overruling requirement to safeguard the heavy fuel stability.

Use
The market of MDO is much smaller than on-highway diesel. According to the a 2004 U.S. Diesel Fuel Sales statistics from U.S. Department of Energy, Energy Information Administration, Marine shipping only takes 3.7% of total diesel market. On the other hand, On-highway diesel takes up 59.5% of diesel fuel sales. This small sales share of MDO is due to the high proportion of petroleum resid that made it can be used on large marine engines. According to Chevron, petroleum resid, or inorganic salts, in the fuel result in injector tip deposits that prevent the injector from creating the desired fuel spray pattern. But those low-speed, large marine diesel engines are appropriate for using fuel containing large amounts of petroleum resid.

Regulations and restrictions
The International Maritime Organization (IMO) develops regulations for marine shipping. Among those regulations, MARPOL (the International Convention for the Prevention of Pollution from Ships) is the most widely adopted one.   MARPOL is the main international convention covering the prevention of operational or accidental pollution of the marine environment by ships.  Inside IMO, there is a committee called MEPC(Marine Environment Protection Committee). MEPC has meetings periodically and discuss resolutions to current marine pollution by adding amendments to its official documents.

References

Liquid fuels
Diesel fuel